Flying Colours is the third album by Australian hip hop group Bliss n Eso. It was released by Illusive Sounds on 26 April 2008.

At the J Awards of 2008, the album was nominated for Australian Album of the Year.

The album was recorded in three different continents over twelve months, and features Illmaculate (World freestyle and Scribble Jam champion), a 20 piece African Zulu Choir (The Zulu Connections Choir), Debaser (US), Hyjak and Phrase. In an interview with The Age newspaper Jonathan Notley (Bliss) explained that the band's previous albums were recorded on the fly, in sporadic periods whenever they could score some studio time, whereas with Flying Colours, the Sydneysiders relocated to Melbourne for three months of dedicated writing and recording at Richmond's Sing Sing Studios"We decided to get out of Sydney and go somewhere where we could get up every day and just focus on making the record. It was great. We weren't worried about the pressure of what people would think, or forcing it or trying to make hits" - Notley

The cover of the album features artwork by tattoo artist, Steve Cross from Melbourne. It depicts a man with blazing coloured wings leaping off a cliff. "With this album we wanted to do something a bit different than just pictures of us. We kinda wanted to go a little bit more creative and imaginative. We thought of this concept of this guy like leaping off this cliff with these flaming colourful wings, and it kind of really worked with the context of this album and obviously the title." - Notley

The first single from the album, a reworking of Citizen Cope's "Bullet and a Target",  gained major national commercial radio and television airplay. Flying Colours features production from Bliss, Phrase and Hattori Hanzo, the album was mixed at Sing Sing Studios (Melbourne) by Noam Dishon and Andy Baldwin (The Cat Empire, Spiderbait, Killing Heidi).

The third single off the album "Eye of the Storm" uses the main riff and idea from folk rock duo Angus & Julia Stone song "Paper Aeroplane".

It was featured as the Triple J feature album in the week leading up to its release.  The album debuted a week after its release at the No. 10 position on the Australian ARIA Albums Chart. and reached the No. 1 position on the ARIA Top 40 Urban Albums chart.

The album was nominated for a J Award in August 2008.

The album was also nominated for an ARIA award for 'Best Urban Release' in 2008.

In an interview with Xpress magazine Notley indicated their surprise at the album's success."To tell you the truth it smashed any of my expectations.  The reception for the record has been fantastic so we couldn't really be happier at the moment." - Notley

Following the group's successful appearance at the Sound Relief concert on 14 March 2009 at the MCG, "Field of Dreams" featuring Paris Wells was officially released to radio as a single.

On 14 June 2009 the album became only the second Australian hip hop record to be certified gold, after being in the ARIA charts for 58 weeks. In October 2010, Flying Colours was listed in the book, 100 Best Australian Albums.

Track listing
All songs written by Jonathon Notley, Max MacKinnon and Noam Dishon, except where noted

Flying Colours
"The Beginning" – 1:41
"Woodstock 2008" – 4:27
"Eye of the Storm" (Jonathon Notley, Max MacKinnon, A. Stone, J. Stone) – 3:27
"Bullet and a Target" (featuring the Zulu Connection Choir) (Clarence Greenwood) – 4:15
"Happy in My Hoody" (featuring Hyjak and Phrase) (Jonathon Notley, Max MacKinnon, J McCarthy, Harley Webster, Vester) – 4:19
"Destiny Lane" (Jonathon Notley, Max MacKinnon, Mark Landon) – 3:41
"Zion Bash" (Jonathon Notley, Max MacKinnon, Mark Landon) – 2:51
"The Sea is Rising" – 5:36
"Gorilla Militia" (Jonathon Notley, Max MacKinnon, Mark Landon) – 3:14
"How to Listen, Part 1" – 3:02
"Climb These Cliffs" (Jonathon Notley, Max MacKinnon, Noam Dishon, Mark Landon) – 3:41
"At Midnight" – 5:21
"Royal Flush" – 3:52
"$5 Steak" (Jonathon Notley, Max MacKinnon, Noam Dishon, Etheridge, Montgo) – 5:35
"The Truth" (featuring ILLmacuLate and Sapient) – 4:41
"Never Give Up" (featuring Changes) (Jonathon Notley, Max MacKinnon, Noam Dishon, Mchunu, Mhlongo) – 4:31
"Field of Dreams" (featuring Paris Wells) – 3:24

Flying Colours limited edition bonus disc
"The Dark Tower" – 5:49 (features a sample from the 1947 radioplay The Dark Tower by Louis MacNeice)
"Lonely Streets" (featuring Debaser) – 4:33
"Bullet and a Target" (acoustic version) (featuring the Zulu Connection Choir) – 3:58
"Mexican Spit Fire" – 2:30
"Choof Choof Train" – 4:09

Charts

References

2008 albums
ARIA Award-winning albums
Bliss n Eso albums